Bhutila Tenzin Karpoche   (born ) is a Canadian politician who has served as the member of Provincial Parliament (MPP) for Parkdale—High Park since June 7, 2018. A member of the Ontario New Democratic Party (NDP), she is the party's early childhood development critic, child care critic, and GTA issues critic. Born in Nepal, Karpoche is the first person of Tibetan descent ever elected to public office in North America.

Early life and education 
Karpoche was born in Nepal and moved to the Toronto neighbourhood of Parkdale when she was 18 with her family.

She holds a master's of public health in epidemiology from the University of Toronto's Dalla Lana School of Public Health and is currently a PhD candidate in public health policy at Toronto Metropolitan University.

Political career 
Prior to her election, Karpoche worked for Cheri DiNovo, her predecessor as MPP for Parkdale—High Park, first in DiNovo's constituency office and more recently as her executive assistant at Queen's Park. She also served on the board of directors of the Canadian Tibetan Association of Ontario, and on the steering committee of the International Tibet Network.

Member of Provincial Parliament 
On September 14, 2017, the Parkdale—High Park NDP riding association nominated Karpoche as the party's candidate in the 2018 general election. She won the election on June 7, 2018, and her party won the second most seats, becoming the Official Opposition.

Following her election, NDP leader Andrea Horwath appointed Karpoche as deputy opposition whip and mental health and addictions critic. In a shadow cabinet shuffle on August 30, 2019, the deputy opposition whip was passed to Doly Begum.

In 2019, she was voted Toronto's Best Local Politician by Toronto Star readers. She was voted Best MPP by Now Magazine readers in 2019, 2020 and 2021.

Karpoche was re-elected in the 2022 election with 53.97% of the popular vote.

Following the selection of Interim Leader Peter Tabuns, Karpoche retained her critic portfolio of early childhood development and children, and was assigned the additional portfolio of GTA issues. On July 15, 2022, it was announced that the Ontario NDP would be nominating Karpoche as a Deputy Speaker in the 43rd parliament.

Electoral record

References 

Ontario New Democratic Party MPPs
21st-century Canadian politicians
21st-century Canadian women politicians
Living people
Women MPPs in Ontario
Canadian people of Tibetan descent
Canadian people of Nepalese descent
Politicians from Toronto
Nepalese emigrants to Canada
1980s births
Tibet freedom activists
People from Kathmandu